General Maude may refer to:

Frederick Francis Maude (1821–1897), British Army general
Stanley Maude (1864–1917), British Army lieutenant general in the Mesopotamian campaign and fall of Baghdad in 1917
Timothy Maude (1947–2001), U.S. Army lieutenant general killed in the September 11, 2001 attacks